Head Music is a 1992 album by The Daou. The album gained favorable critical reviews for its originality. CD Review wrote that "The Daou's debut album embraces dance-oriented Europop more whole-heartedly than any previous English-language release." The first single "Surrender Yourself" spent 11 weeks at the top of the Dance Chart.

Track listing
"Surrender Yourself" – 4:22
"Skin Deep" – 4:15
"Sympathy Bouquet" – 5:21
"Solitaire" – 3:52
"Never Ending Winter" – 4:28
"Figure In The Sand" – 3:59
"Her Universe" – 3:19
"What Are You Guilty Of?" – 6:06
"The Way" – 3:02

References

1992 albums
Vanessa Daou albums